Rainer Scholz (3 September 1954 – 1 July 2022) was a German football player and manager who played as a defender.

References

External links 
 

1954 births
2022 deaths
German footballers
Association football defenders
Bundesliga players
2. Bundesliga players
Würzburger Kickers players
Hannover 96 players
SV Waldhof Mannheim players
SV Darmstadt 98 players
German football managers
SV Darmstadt 98 managers
BV Cloppenburg managers
People from Fürstenfeldbruck (district)
Sportspeople from Upper Bavaria